Theodor Rudolph Joseph Nitschke (26 July 1834, Breslau – 12 December 1883, Münster) was a German botanist and mycologist.
He received his education in Breslau, obtaining his PhD in 1858. In 1860 he relocated to Münster, where in 1867 he was named professor of botany at the university, also serving as director of the botanical academy and botanical garden.

In his earlier research he was interested in angiosperms such as the genus Rosa and the species Drosera rotundifolia (common sundew), From the late 1860s, he focused on mycology, publishing significant works on the fungal class Pyrenomycetes.

The fungal genera  Acanthonitschkea, Nitschkia and Nitschkiopsis are named in his honor.

Selected works 
 "Commentatio anatomico-physiologica de Droserae rotundifoliae", (1858).
 "Pyrenomycetes germanici", (1867 to 1870).

See also
 :Category:Taxa named by Theodor Rudolph Joseph Nitschke

References 

1834 births
1883 deaths
Academic staff of the University of Münster
Scientists from Wrocław
19th-century German botanists
German mycologists
People from the Province of Silesia